Lount is a hamlet in Leicestershire, England.

Lount may also mean:

Surname
 Samuel Lount (1791–1838), rebellion organiser in Canada
 William Lount (1840–1903), Canadian lawyer and politician

Places
 Lount Township, Ontario, in Central Ontario

Other uses
 Lount Meadows, in Lount, Leicestershire
 New Lount, a nature reserve in Leicestershire
 Samuel Lount (film)